David Frederick Swensen (January 26, 1954 – May 5, 2021) was an American investor, endowment fund manager, and philanthropist. He was the chief investment officer at Yale University from 1985 until his death in May 2021.

Swensen was responsible for managing and investing Yale's endowment assets and investment funds, which totaled $25.4 billion as of September 2016. As of September 2019 the total amount is $30.3 billion. He was considered to be the highest-paid employee in Yale, leading a team of about 30 employees. He invented The Yale Model with Dean Takahashi, an application of the modern portfolio theory commonly known in the investing world as the "Endowment Model." His investing philosophy has been dubbed the "Swensen Approach" and is unique in that it stresses allocation of capital in Treasury inflation protection securities, government bonds, real estate funds, emerging market stocks, domestic stocks, and developing world international equities.

His investment success with the Yale Endowment has attracted the notice of Wall Street portfolio managers and other universities. "He's right up there with John Bogle, Peter Lynch, [Benjamin] Graham, and [David] Dodd as a major force in investment management," says Byron Wien, a longtime Wall Street strategist. Investment heads from universities such as Harvard, MIT, Princeton, Wesleyan, and the University of Pennsylvania have adopted his allocation strategies to mixed success. Under Swensen's guidance the Yale Endowment saw an average annual return of 11.8 percent from 1999 to 2009. As of the 2016 fiscal year, Yale's endowment had risen by 3.4%, the most out of any Ivy League school, according to Institutional Investor.

Swensen was listed third on aiCIO's 2012, a list of the 100 most influential institutional investors worldwide. In 2008, he was inducted into Institutional Investors Alphas Hedge Fund Manager Hall of Fame.

Early life and education
David Frederick Swensen was born in Ames, Iowa, on January 26, 1954, and was raised in River Falls, Wisconsin. His father, Richard David "Dick" Swensen, was a chemistry professor and dean at the University of Wisconsin-River Falls. His mother, Grace Marie (Hartman), after raising six children, became a Lutheran minister. After graduating from River Falls High School in 1971 Swensen elected to stay in his hometown of River Falls and receive his B.A. and B.S. in 1975 from the University of Wisconsin-River Falls where his father Richard Swensen was a professor. Swensen pursued a PhD in economics at Yale, where he wrote his dissertation, A Model for the Valuation of Corporate Bonds. One of Swensen's dissertation advisers at Yale was James Tobin, a top economic adviser to John F. Kennedy administration and a future Nobel Prize laureate in economics. According to Charles Ellis, founder of Greenwich Associates and former chair of Yale's investment committee, "When it snowed, David went to Jim's house to shovel the sidewalk". James Tobin's Nobel Prize, among other things, was for his contribution in creation of Modern Portfolio Theory. Swensen was fascinated by the idea of Modern Portfolio Theory. During his 2018 reunion speech Swensen said: "For a given level of return, if you diversify you can get that return at lower risk. For a given level of risk, if you diversify you can get a higher return. That's pretty cool! Free lunch!"

 Investment career 
Swensen began his investment career in the early 1980s, and has since advised the Carnegie Corporation, the New York Stock Exchange, the Howard Hughes Medical Institute, the Courtauld Institute of Art, the Yale-New Haven Hospital, The Investment Fund for Foundations (TIFF), the Edna McConnell Clark Foundation, and the States of Connecticut and Massachusetts.

 Salomon Brothers 
Following his academic interest in valuation of corporate bonds, Swensen joined Salomon Brothers in 1980. This career move was suggested by a Salomon Brothers investment banker and Yale alumni, Gene Dattel, who was deeply impressed by Swensen. In 1981 Swensen worked as an associate in corporate finance for Salomon Brothers to structure the world's first currency swap agreement, a deal between IBM and the World Bank which allowed IBM to hedge their exposure to Swiss francs and German marks and the World Bank to make loans in those currencies more efficiently.

 Lehman Brothers 
Prior to joining Yale in 1985, Swensen spent three years on Wall Street as senior vice president at Lehman Brothers, specializing in the firm's swap activities, where his work focused on developing new financial products. Swensen engineered the first currency swap transaction according to When Genius Failed: The Rise and Fall of Long-Term Capital Management by Roger Lowenstein.

 Yale University endowment 
Swensen was tapped to serve as the Yale endowment manager at age 31 in 1985. This position was offered by Swensen's other dissertation adviser, Yale's provost, William Brainard. Swensen's candidacy was suggested by James Tobin, who, despite his former student's young age, believed he could be the right person. Swensen was hesitant about taking the job at first, since he did not know much about portfolio management aside from his studies in graduate school. Nevertheless, Brainard convinced him to take the position and Swensen started on April 1, 1985, by taking an 80% pay cut. A year later, in 1986, he was joined by Yale College and School of Management graduate Dean Takahashi, who soon became Swensen's trusted deputy. In 1985, when Swensen started managing the endowment, it was worth $1 billion; in 2019 it was worth $29.4 billion.

As of 2005, the fund had managed annualized returns of 16.1%. He has been called "Yale's 8 billion dollar man" for his attainment of nearly $8 billion for the college endowment from 1985 to 2005. According to former Yale President, economist Richard Levin, Swensen's "contribution" to Yale is greater than the sum of all the donations made in more than two decades. "We've just done better," Levin says, because of Swensen's "uncanny ability" to pick the best outside money managers. Swensen's former staff members, who later became managers of other endowment funds - including MIT, Stanford and Princeton - also showed impressive results in multiplying fund wealth.

In September 2014, Swensen began to move the Yale endowment away from investment in companies that have a large greenhouse footprint, expressing Yale's preferences in a letter to the endowment's money managers. The letter asked them to consider the effect of their investments on climate change, and to refrain from investing in companies that do not make reasonable efforts to reduce carbon emissions. This method was characterized by Swensen as a more subtle and flexible approach, as opposed to outright divestment.

Swensen made headlines on March 5, 2018 for arguing with the undergraduate editor-in-chief of the Yale Daily News. Swensen called the editor-in-chief a "coward" for deleting an inaccurate sentence and removing a footnote in an op-ed that he submitted to the paper; his column, which he required to be published unedited, responded to a student teach-in that criticized companies allegedly in the Yale portfolio.

 Investment philosophy 
On January 28, 2009, Swensen and Michael Schmidt, a financial analyst at Yale, published an op-ed piece in The New York Times entitled "News You Can Endow" discussing the idea of newspaper organizations run as non-profits by endowments. On August 13, 2011, David Swensen published an op-ed in The New York Times entitled "The Mutual Fund Merry-Go-Round," about how the pursuit of profits by the management companies creates a conflict of interest with fiduciary responsibilities to their investors. The advertising of Morningstar ratings leads investors to chase past leaders and roll money out of recently downgraded or poorly rated funds into recently upgraded or highly rated funds. The result is the equivalent of buying high and selling low and results in returns for a typical investor far worse than simply buying-and-holding the funds themselves, especially for highly volatile areas such as technology funds. People would do better to focus on diversification among sectors and asset classes, which are the main determinants of long-term results.

The Yale ModelThe Yale Model, sometimes known as the Endowment Model''', was developed by David Swensen and Dean Takahashi and is described in Swensen's book Pioneering Portfolio Management. It consists broadly of dividing a portfolio into five or six roughly equal parts and investing each in a different asset class. Central in the Yale Model is broad diversification and an equity orientation, avoiding asset classes with low expected returns such as fixed income and commodities.

Particularly revolutionary at the time was his recognition that liquidity is a bad thing to be avoided rather than a good thing to be sought out, since it comes at a heavy price in the shape of lower returns. The Yale Model is thus characterized by relatively heavy exposure to asset classes such as private equity compared to more traditional portfolios. The model is also characterized by heavy reliance on investment managers in these specialized asset classes, a characteristic that has made manager selection at Yale a famously careful process.

This type of investing — allocating only a small amount to traditional U.S. equities and bonds and more to alternative investments — is followed by many larger endowments and foundations and is therefore also known as the "Endowment Model" (of investing).

Soon after heading the Yale investment office, Swensen, together with Takahashi, sought out investments that would allow both diversification and higher return. They also implemented strategies that would take advantage of endowment idiosyncrasies: presumption of perpetuity, tax-exempt status, as well as distinguished and devoted alumni in the financial world. Hence, investments were made in venture capital firms, tech firms, and hedge funds. At the early stages not many firms dealt with types of assets Swensen was interested in. In order to invest in such assets he first helped to create those assets by becoming a venture capitalist of venture capitalists. As of 2019 about 60% of Yale endowment portfolio is allocated to alternative investments such as hedge funds, venture capital and private equity.

 Criticism of the Endowment Model 
After Harvard's endowment dropped a record 30% to $26 billion in the year ended June 2009, an 81-page report released in May 2010 found that "The endowment model of investing is broken. Whatever long-term gains it may have produced for colleges and universities in the past must now be weighed more fully against its costs — to campuses, to communities and to the wider financial system that has come under such severe stress." In a video interview, Mark W. Yusko founder of Morgan Creek Capital Management, one of the veterans of the endowment investment model, claims that one year where endowments did not outperform but rather "tie everybody else" does not break the endowment model. According to Yusko, the endowment model is still the most viable proposition for long-term investors. Investors would also realize that mark-to-market reporting has a bigger impact on reported performance than before.

Many institutional investors have tried to replicate the Swensen Approach and the Yale Model to fit their hedge funds, pensions funds, and endowments, but have not seen the same results.

Unconventional success
In 2005, Swensen wrote a book called Unconventional Success, which is an investment guide for the individual investor. The general strategy that he presents can be boiled down to the following three main points of advice:

The investor should construct a portfolio with money allocated to 6 core asset classes, diversifying among them and biasing toward the equity sections.
The investor should rebalance the portfolio on a regular basis (rebalancing back to the original weightings of the asset classes in the portfolio).
In the absence of confidence in a market-beating strategy, invest in low-cost index funds and exchange-traded funds. The investor should be very watchful of costs as some indices are poorly constructed and some fund companies charge excessive fees (or generate large tax liabilities).

He slams many mutual fund companies for charging excessive fees and not living up to their fiduciary responsibility. He highlights the conflict of interest inherent in the mutual funds, claiming they want high fee, high turnover funds while investors want the opposite.

 Personal life 
Swensen lived in Killingworth, Connecticut. Some Yale alumni had mounted a campaign to name one of two new residential colleges after Swensen; the two residential colleges were ultimately named after Benjamin Franklin and Pauli Murray.

Swensen taught endowment management at Yale College and at the Yale School of Management. He was a fellow of Berkeley College and an incorporator of the Elizabethan Club.

Swensen died from kidney cancer at Yale New Haven Hospital on May 5, 2021, aged 67.

 Political and economic views 
In February 2009, Swensen was named to a two-year term on President Barack Obama's Economic Recovery Advisory Board, on which he served from 2009 to 2011.

 Views on capital markets 
During an interview with Yale's international center of finance, he stated that capital markets would be much better off under the Glass–Steagall legislation (provisions in the U.S. Banking Act of 1933 that limits the interaction between stock activities within commercial and investment banks). He stated that "commercial banking serves a very important, useful function: gathering of deposits and making of loans, and if we define that function very narrowly and regulate it very heavily and required it to maintain a high level of capital then the capital environment would be much safer."

 Legacy and honors 
Swensen won numerous awards for his investing and management of Yale's endowment. In 2012, he won the Yale Medal for "outstanding individual service to the University." In 2008, he was awarded the American Academy of Arts & Sciences Fellowship and the year prior, the Mory's Cup for "conspicuous service to Yale." Also in 2007, he was awarded the Hopkins Medal "for commitment, devotion and loyalty to Hopkins School." In 2004, he won the Institutional Investor Award for Excellence in Investment Management.

In 2008, he was inducted into Institutional Investors Alpha's Hedge Fund Manager Hall of Fame along with Alfred Jones, Bruce Kovner, George Soros, Jack Nash, James Simons, Julian Roberston, Kenneth Griffin, Leon Levy, Louis Bacon, Michael Steinhardt, Paul Tudor Jones, Seth Klarman and Steven A. Cohen.

 See also 
 List of University of Wisconsin-River Falls people
 List of Yale University alumni

 Bibliography Pioneering Portfolio Management: An Unconventional Approach to Institutional Investment (2000) , Free PressUnconventional Success: A Fundamental Approach to Personal Investment (2005) , Free Press

References

External links
 ECON 252 Lecture 9 guest lecture by Swensen at Yale University
Yale University biography
Brookings Institution trustee biographyYale Alumni Magazine: "Yale's $8 billion man"The New York Times: "For Yale's Money Man, a Higher Calling"National Public Radio: "Yale's Money Guru Shares Wisdom with Masses"National Public Radio: "Yale Money Whiz Shares Tips on Growing a Nest Egg (4/3/08)"National Public Radio'': "Despite Losses, Star Investor Trusts in Stocks (3/4/09)"

1954 births
2021 deaths
20th-century American businesspeople
21st-century American businesspeople
American financiers
American investors
American money managers
American philanthropists
Businesspeople from Connecticut
Businesspeople from Iowa
Businesspeople from Wisconsin
Deaths from cancer in Connecticut
Deaths from kidney cancer
People from Ames, Iowa
People from Killingworth, Connecticut
People from River Falls, Wisconsin
University of Wisconsin–River Falls alumni
Yale School of Management faculty
Yale University alumni
Yale University faculty